D. australis  may refer to:
 Delma australis, a lizard species in the genus Delma
 Diospyros australis, a shrub or small tree species found in Australia
 Dryococelus australis, the Lord Howe Island stick insect, an insect species found on the Lord Howe Island Group
 Duplicaria australis, a sea snail species
 Dusicyon australis, the Falkland Islands wolf or warrah, an extinct land mammal species found only on the Falkland Islands

See also
 Australis (disambiguation)